Mahine', also called Te-hei-’ura or Puru (1761–1838) was the king of the island of Huahine. Huahine is an island located among the Society Islands, in French Polynesia. He was born in 1761.

Mahine Tehei’ura became a king in 1810 after the abdication of Tenania, his brother. In 1815 he abdicated for his niece Teri'itaria of Raiatea.

See also
Kingdom of Huahine
List of monarchs of Huahine

References

1761 births
1838 deaths
Oceanian monarchs
Huahine royalty
Converts to Protestantism from pagan religions